Cytûn: Churches Together in Wales ("agreed") is a national ecumenical organisation of churches in Wales, formed in 1990. It is the successor to the former Council of Churches for Wales. Cytûn's offices are located in Richmond Road, Cardiff.

Members
The full members of Cytûn are: 
Baptist Union of Wales
Church in Wales
Congregational Federation
Covenanted Baptist Churches (BUGB)
German-speaking Lutheran Church in South Wales
Methodist Church
Presbyterian Church of Wales
Religious Society of Friends (Quakers)
Roman Catholic Church
Salvation Army
Union of Welsh Independents
United Reformed Church

The observers are: 
Black Majority Churches in Wales
Churches Together in Britain and Ireland
Free Church Council of Wales
Lutheran Council of Great Britain
Eastern Orthodox Churches
Seventh-day Adventists

Chief Executive
The Chief Executive of Cytûn is Aled Edwards. Previously he was the Cytûn National Assembly for Wales Liaison Officer. He was ordained in the Church in Wales Diocese of Bangor in 1979. For eight years (1985-93) he served as rector of a joint Anglican/Presbyterian Local Ecumenical Project on the Llŷn Peninsula in Gwynedd before becoming Vicar of the key Welsh language parish of Eglwys Dewi Sant in the centre of Cardiff. He also chairs a number of voluntary bodies including the Welsh Refugee Council and Displaced People in Action. He is also a Fellow of the Institute of Welsh Affairs. Aled Edwards succeeded Gethin Abraham-Williams.

Aled Edwards was succeeded in the post of National Assembly Liaison Officer by Geraint Hopkins, when the job title changed to Policy Officer.

See also
Action of Churches Together in Scotland
Churches Together in Britain and Ireland
Churches Together in England
Conference of European Churches
Covenanted Churches in Wales
Irish Council of Churches
Religion in Wales
World Council of Churches

External links
Cytûn website
Cytûn Llandudno Churches Together

Christianity in Wales
National councils of churches
Religious organisations based in Wales